The Nodding Canaries is a 1961 mystery detective novel by the British writer Gladys Mitchell. It is the thirty fourth in the long-running series of books featuring Mitchell's best known character, the psychoanalyst and amateur detective Mrs Bradley. The title refers to the tradition of keeping canaries in mines to watch out for a rise in dangerous gasses.

Synopsis
While accompanying two potential candidates for a teaching post through the caves at Pigmy’s Ladder, schoolmistress Alice Boorman loses contact with her charges who nearly die of suffocation from noxious fumes. A subsequent investigation by Dame Beatrice Bradley uncovers the corpse of local man Oliver Breydon-Waters hidden in a nearby alcove.

References

Bibliography
 Reilly, John M. Twentieth Century Crime & Mystery Writers. Springer, 2015.

1961 British novels
Novels by Gladys Mitchell
British crime novels
British mystery novels
British thriller novels
Novels set in England
British detective novels
Michael Joseph books